Stadt Moers Park is a public park located in Whiston, Merseyside in  the Metropolitan Borough of Knowsley.

History
Before the park was established, Tushingham's Brickworks was built on the site in the 1890s. When the site became derelict in 1976, the park was used as a landfill site for domestic refuse.

In 1983, Knowsley Metropolitan Borough Council began cleaning up the area and turned the site into a country park known today as Stadt Moers. The name Stadt Moers comes from Knowsley's twin town of Moers in Germany.

The Green Space Ranger Service for Prescot, Whiston and Cronton are based at the environment centre here and run many public events throughout the year.

A 5 km free, weekly, timed parkrun is held at 9am every Saturday.

References

External links
 Knowsley Council Website

Metropolitan Borough of Knowsley
Urban public parks
Parks and commons in the Metropolitan Borough of Knowsley